Hendricus "Dick" Dankers (Amsterdam, 22 April 1950 - Brazil, 2 March 2018) was a Dutch furniture designer, and founder and gallery owner of The Frozen Fountain on the Prinsengracht in Amsterdam. He is remembered  as "the man who brought the Netherlands to design."

Life and work

Youth and early years in interior design and sales 
Dankers was born in Amsterdam and grew up in Rotterdam, where he completed the social academy after high school. After a world tour through America and Israel, he opened his first interior store in Amsterdam around 1975, focusing on vintage and art deco furniture.

In 1985 Dankers opened The Frozen Fountain interior store in the Utrechtsestraat in Amsterdam. He collaborated with young designers to show their work, and also designed carpets and furniture himself. In 1990 he won the Dutch Furniture Award with his own designed round chest of drawers .

The Frozen Fountain on the Prinsengracht 
In 1992 in collaboration with Cok de Rooy they started The Frozen Fountain design gallery and moved to the Prinsengracht. The store offered a platform for starting designers such as Jurgen Bey, Piet Hein Eek, Hella Jongerius, Marcel Wanders, and Studio Job.

In the first half of the 1990s, The Frozen Fountain organized several exhibitions with multiple design disciplines. There was a duo exhibition by Tejo Remy and Viktor & Rolf, and a duo exhibition by the theater group Alex d'Electrique and Henk Stallinga.

Death 
Dankers drowned in the sea while visiting his daughter in Brazil .

References

External links 
 IN MEMORIAM - Dick Dankers 

1950 births
2018 deaths
Dutch furniture designers